The 1963 Western Michigan Broncos baseball team represented Western Michigan University in the 1963 NCAA University Division baseball season. The Broncos played their home games at Hyames Field. The team was coached by Charlie Maher in his 25th year at Western Michigan.

The Broncos won the District IV playoff to advanced to the College World Series, where they were defeated by the Penn State Nittany Lions.

Roster

Schedule 

! style="" | Regular Season
|- valign="top" 

|- align="center" bgcolor="#ccffcc"
| 1 || April 5 ||  || Hyames Field • Kalamazoo, Michigan || 22–1 || 1–0 || 1–0
|- align="center" bgcolor="#ccffcc"
| 2 || April 6 || Ken State || Hyames Field • Kalamazoo, Michigan || 6–0 || 2–0 || 2–0
|- align="center" bgcolor="#ccffcc"
| 3 || April 12 ||  || Hyames Field • Kalamazoo, Michigan || 6–2 || 3–0 || 2–0
|- align="center" bgcolor="#ffcccc"
| 4 || April 13 || Ohio State || Hyames Field • Kalamazoo, Michigan || 3–9 || 3–1 || 2–0
|- align="center" bgcolor="#ccffcc"
| 5 || April 13 || Ohio State || Hyames Field • Kalamazoo, Michigan || 5–4 || 4–1 || 2–0
|- align="center" bgcolor="#ccffcc"
| 6 || April 15 || at  || Unknown • Muncie, Indiana || 13–6 || 5–1 || 2–0
|- align="center" bgcolor="#ccffcc"
| 7 || April 16 || at Ball State || Unknown • Muncie, Indiana || 3–2 || 6–1 || 2–0
|- align="center" bgcolor="#ccffcc"
| 8 || April 17 || at Ball State || Unknown • Muncie, Indiana || 17–3 || 7–1 || 2–0
|- align="center" bgcolor="#ccffcc"
| 9 || April 19 ||  || Hyames Field • Kalamazoo, Michigan || 6–1 || 8–1 || 3–0
|- align="center" bgcolor="#ccffcc"
| 10 || April 20 || Ohio || Hyames Field • Kalamazoo, Michigan || 10–5 || 9–1 || 4–0
|- align="center" bgcolor="#ccffcc"
| 11 || April  || at  || Unknown • Huntington, West Virginia || 16–1 || 10–1 || 5–0
|- align="center" bgcolor="#ccffcc"
| 12 || April  || at Marshall || Unknown • Huntington, West Virginia || 11–0 || 11–1 || 6–0
|-

|- align="center" bgcolor="#ccffcc"
| 13 || May 3 || at  || Unknown • Bowling Green, Ohio || 13–6 || 12–1 || 7–0
|- align="center" bgcolor="#ccffcc"
| 14 || May 4 || at Bowling Green || Unknown • Bowling Green, Ohio || 11–0 || 13–1 || 8–0
|- align="center" bgcolor="#ccffcc"
| 15 || May 7 || at  || Old College Field • East Lansing, Michigan || 9–5 || 14–1 || 8–0
|- align="center" bgcolor="#ccffcc"
| 16 || May  || at  || Unknown • Toledo, Ohio || 12–4 || 15–1 || 9–0
|- align="center" bgcolor="#ccffcc"
| 17 || May  || at Toledo || Unknown • Toledo, Ohio || 4–0 || 16–1 || 10–0
|- align="center" bgcolor="#ccffcc"
| 18 || May 17 ||  || Hyames Field • Kalamazoo, Michigan || 3–1 || 17–1 || 11–0
|- align="center" bgcolor="#ccffcc"
| 19 || May 18 || Miami (OH) || Hyames Field • Kalamazoo, Michigan || 3–2 || 18–1 || 12–0
|- align="center" bgcolor="#ffcccc"
| 20 || May  ||  || Hyames Field • Kalamazoo, Michigan || 0–3 || 18–2 || 12–0
|- align="center" bgcolor="#ccffcc"
| 21 || May 21 || Michigan State || Hyames Field • Kalamazoo, Michigan || 13–3 || 19–2 || 12–0
|- align="center" bgcolor="#ffcccc"
| 22 || May 22 || at Michigan || Ray Fisher Stadium • Ann Arbor, Michigan || 5–7 || 19–3 || 12–0
|- align="center" bgcolor="#ccffcc"
| 23 || May 24 || at  || Cartier Field • Notre Dame, Indiana || 5–2 || 20–3 || 12–0
|- align="center" bgcolor="#ccffcc"
| 24 || May 25 || Notre Dame || Hyames Field • Kalamazoo, Michigan || 5–4 || 21–3 || 12–0
|-

|-
|-
! style="" | Postseason
|- valign="top"

|- align="center" bgcolor="#ccffcc"
| 25 || May 30 || vs Notre Dame || Illinois Field • Champaign, Illinois || 2–1 || 22–3 || 12–0
|- align="center" bgcolor="#ccffcc"
| 26 || May 31 || at  || Illinois Field • Champaign, Illinois || 1–0 || 23–3 || 12–0
|- align="center" bgcolor="#ffcccc"
| 27 || June 1 || at Illinois || Illinois Field • Champaign, Illinois || 0–8 || 23–4 || 12–0
|- align="center" bgcolor="#ccffcc"
| 28 || June 1 || at Illinois || Illinois Field • Champaign, Illinois || 7–0 || 24–4 || 12–0
|-

|- align="center" bgcolor="#ffcccc"
| 29 || June 10 || vs Florida State || Omaha Municipal Stadium • Omaha, Nebraska || 2–5 || 24–5 || 12–0
|- align="center" bgcolor="#ffcccc"
| 30 || June 11 || vs Penn State || Omaha Municipal Stadium • Omaha, Nebraska || 0–3 || 24–6 || 12–0
|-

Awards and honors 
Fred Decker
 First Team All-MAC

Al Drews
 Second Team All-MAC
 Second Team All-American

Dave Kwaitkowski
 First Team All-MAC

Fred Michalski
 Second Team All-American

Dan Predovic
 First Team All-MAC

Lee Salo
 First Team All-MAC

John Sluka
 Second Team All-MAC

References 

Western Michigan Broncos baseball seasons
Western Michigan Broncos baseball
College World Series seasons
Western Michigan
Mid-American Conference baseball champion seasons